Apeltes is a monospecific genus old ray-finned fish belonging to the family Gasterosteidae, the sticklebacks. The only species in the genus is Apeltes quadracus, the fourspine stickleback or bloody stickleback, which lives in  freshwater, brackish and benthopelagic environments of the northwestern Atlantic Ocean between Newfoundland and South Carolina.

Appearance 
The fourspine stickleback is the smallest member of the family Gasterosteidae. It generally has either four or five dorsal spines but may have as many as seven. It has an elongated fusiform body that is spotted brown to olive green except for the underside. Its belly is silvery white. Males tend to be darker than females and develop red pelvic spines. The first three dorsal spines are close together and stick out at acute angles, each with their own triangular membrane. The fourth spine is straight and associated with the dorsal fin. Its lateral line ends blow the origin of the second dorsal fin. Its pelvic fins sit almost right below the pectoral fins in the thoracic region. The species does not have scales. They can grow 5 to 6 centimeters in length, but they usually grow to be about 4 centimeters.

Occurrence 
The species is found from Newfoundland and Quebec southward to North Carolina, living close to the freshwater shores in well-vegetated areas. It has been introduced to a few freshwater bodies in Pennsylvania, Alabama, New Jersey, and in Lake Superior.

Ecology 
Fourspine sticklebacks are largely solitary, spending most of their time near the bottom of lakes. Their diet consists of microscopic invertebrates and plankton. Fourspine stickleback generally breed at one year of age, though some individuals may survive to breed at age two. Their breeding season lasts from April until late July, often breeding at the same time and location as three other stickleback species (threespine, ninespine, and blackspotted stickleback). Males establish territories and construct nests out of vegetation either on the bottom or on underwater structures, and may construct as many as five nests stacked in a tiered effect. Once he has attracted a female and fertilized her eggs, the male will watch over the nest until the eggs hatch. Females may produce several clutches of eggs per year.

References

External links

 GMA - Apeltes quadracus
 NAS - Apeltes quadracus
 Fishbase.org - Apeltes quadracus

Gasterosteidae
Monotypic fish genera
Fish of North America
Fish of the Great Lakes